Oliver Glen Shaw (born 12 March 1998) is a Scottish professional footballer who plays for EFL League One club Barnsley. He has previously played for Kilmarnock, Hibernian, Stenhousemuir, Ross County and represented Scotland at the under-19 and under-21 levels.

Early life
Shaw is from the Barnton area of Edinburgh, and although a Hibernian fan initially joined local rivals Heart of Midlothian as a youth player before signing for Hibernian. Although his fandom of hiberian is disputed by those who knew Oli at a young age. His father is retired footballer Greg Shaw, who played for Ayr United, Falkirk, Dunfermline Athletic, Airdrieonians, Clydebank and Berwick Rangers.

Club career
After establishing himself in the Hibernian youth team squad, he made his first team debut for the club in a Scottish League Cup match against Montrose on 1 August 2015, which Hibernian won 3–0. Having passed his driving test the same day, he was included as a substitute by then-manager Alan Stubbs, and replaced Alex Harris in the 75th minute.

Shaw was sent to Scottish League One side Stenhousemuir on a development loan for the 2016–17 season. He also continued to play for the Hibs development team and was the top goalscorer in the 2016–17 SPFL Development League.

Shaw scored his first goal for the Hibs first team on 22 October 2017, in a 4–2 defeat against Celtic in the 2017–18 Scottish League Cup semi-final. He scored his first league game for Hibs on 10 December, also against Celtic. In January 2018, Shaw signed a contract with Hibs that was due to run until the end of the 2020–21 season. He continued to play for the Hibs under-20 team, and was again the top goalscorer in the Development League in 2017–18.

Shaw struggled to get playing time during 2019, with his last start for Hibs coming in February 2019. He was sold to Ross County in January 2020 for an undisclosed fee.

Kilmarnock
On 31 August 2021, Shaw joined Kilmarnock on a two-year deal, signing for an undisclosed fee.

After a good start in front of goal for Kilmarnock, he won the Scottish Championship player of the Month award for October 2021 having scored five goals in five games in the league that month.

Barnsley
On 31 January 2023, Shaw joined Barnsley on a two-and-a-half year deal for an undisclosed fee.

International career
Shaw scored for the Scotland under-19s against Sweden on 4 October 2016 in a warm-up game ahead of qualification for the 2017 UEFA European Under-19 Championship. Scotland were drawn against Israel, Andorra and Liechtenstein in Group C of the qualification tournament, and progressed to the Elite qualifying stage after finishing second in the group. With all three matches being played in Andorra over 6 days from 25 October 2016, Shaw scored the only goal of the game against Liechtenstein and also featured in the matches against Andorra and Israel. Shaw was added to the Scotland under-21 squad in August 2018.

Career statistics

Notes

References

External links
 

1998 births
Living people
Footballers from Edinburgh
Scottish footballers
Association football forwards
Hibernian F.C. players
Stenhousemuir F.C. players
Ross County F.C. players
Kilmarnock F.C. players
Scottish Professional Football League players
Scotland youth international footballers
Scotland under-21 international footballers
Barnsley F.C. players